Battus polydamas, also known as the gold rim swallowtail, the Polydamas swallowtail or the tailless swallowtail, is a species of butterfly in the family Papilionidae. The species was first described by Carl Linnaeus in his 10th edition of Systema Naturae, published in 1758.

Description
The wingspan is  without the tail. The top of the wings are black with a broad submarginal band formed by large yellow spots. The undersides of the forewings have the same pattern, while the hindwings have a submarginal row of red lunules. This butterfly flies from April to November in three generations in the north of its range, throughout the year in several generations in the tropics. The larvae feed on Aristolochia plant species.

Distribution
It is found in the Neotropical realm of South America, the southeastern U.S., and Mexico.

Habitat
Battus polydamas is mainly present in open woods and abandoned fields.

Subspecies
The species is divided into the following subspecies:

 B. p. antiquus (Rothschild & Jordan, 1906) – Antigua
 B. p. archidamas (Boisduval, 1836) – Chile
 B. p. atahualpa Racheli & Pischedda, 1987 – Peru
 B. p. cebriones (Dalman, 1823)
 B. p. christopheranus (Hall, 1936)
 B. p. cubensis (Dufrane, 1946) – Cuba
 B. p. dominicus (Rothschild & Jordan, 1906) – Dominica
 B. p. grenadensis (Hall, 1930)

 B. p. jamaicensis (Rothschild & Jordan, 1906) – Jamaica
 B. p. lucayus (Rothschild & Jordan, 1906) – Bahamas
 B. p. lucianus (Rothschild & Jordan, 1906) – St. Lucia
 B. p. neodamas (Lucas, 1852) – Guadeloupe
 B. p. peruanus (Fuchs, 1954) – Peru
 B. p. polycrates (Hopffer, 1865) – Haïti, Dominican Republic

 B. p. polydamas (Linnaeus, 1758) – tropical South America
 B. p. psittacus (Molina, 1782) – Argentina
 B. p. renani Lamas, 1998 – Peru
 B. p. streckerianus (Honrath, 1884) – Peru
 B. p. thyamus (Rothschild & Jordan, 1906) – Puerto Rico, Virgin Islands
 B. p. vincentius (Rothschild & Jordan, 1906)
 B. p. xenodamas (Hübner, 1825) – Martinique
 B. p. weyrauchi Lamas, 1998 – Peru

See also
 List of butterflies of Jamaica

References

 Mathew, G. F. (1877). "Life history of Papilio archidamas". Entomologist's Monthly Magazine. 14 (163): 152–153.
 Brown, F. Martin & Heineman, Bernard. Jamaica and its Butterflies. (E. W. Classey, London 1972), plate VIII
 Smart, Paul (1976). The Illustrated Encyclopedia of the Butterfly World in Color. London, Salamander: Encyclopedie des papillons. Lausanne, Elsevier Sequoia (French language edition)   page 159 fig. 19 as B. archidamas Bsdv., underside (Chile), fig. 17 as polydamas (Mexico).

External links

 
 Polydamas swallowtail on the UF / IFAS Featured Creatures Web site

polydamas
Butterflies of North America
Butterflies of Central America
Butterflies of the Caribbean
Papilionidae of South America
Butterflies of Cuba
Butterflies of Jamaica
Lepidoptera of Colombia
Lepidoptera of Ecuador
Lepidoptera of Venezuela
Butterflies described in 1758
Taxa named by Carl Linnaeus